Si Racha is a subdistrict and town in Thailand on the east coast of the Gulf of Thailand, about 120 km southeast of Bangkok in Si Racha district, Chonburi province. Si Racha is known as the provenance of the popular hot sauce, Sriracha, which is named after the town.

History
The municipality was created as a subdistrict municipality (thesaban tambon) in 1945. In 1995, the subdistrict municipality was upgraded to a town municipality (thesaban mueang).

Education

The Thai-Japanese Association School Sriracha, a Japanese international school, is in Si Racha. It is an affiliate of the Thai-Japanese Association School in Bangkok. Si Racha formerly housed the Sriracha-Pattaya Japanese Supplement School, a Japanese weekend school.

References

External links

Populated places in Chonburi province